A talking donkey is a type of talking animal, in this case a donkey. Examples include:
Balaam's donkey, in the Old Testament
Eeyore, character from the Winnie-the-Pooh series
Puzzle, in C. S. Lewis' book The Last Battle, the last volume of The Chronicles of Narnia
Donkey (Shrek), in the animated franchise

See also
 Cultural references to donkeys
 List of fictional ungulates
 Talking animals in fiction

Lists of fictional animals by type